J'maal Alexander (born 26 October 1993 in Tortola, British Virgin Islands) is a runner from the British Virgin Islands who competed at the 2012 Summer Olympics in the 100 m event but was eliminated in the preliminary round.

References

External links 
 J'maal Alexander at Olympedia
 

1993 births
Living people
British Virgin Islands male sprinters
Olympic athletes of the British Virgin Islands
Athletes (track and field) at the 2012 Summer Olympics
Athletes (track and field) at the 2010 Summer Youth Olympics
People from Tortola